Leuronoma fauvella is a moth of the family Gelechiidae. It was described by Viette in 1957. It is found on La Réunion.

References

Moths described in 1957
Leuronoma